The 2002 European Grand Prix (formally the 2002 Allianz Grand Prix of Europe) was a Formula One motor race held on 23 June 2002 at the Nürburgring, Nürburg, Rhineland-Palatinate, Germany. It was won by Ferrari driver Rubens Barrichello, his first win since his victory at the 2000 German Grand Prix. His team mate Michael Schumacher finished second in another dominating performance by the team. McLaren-Mercedes driver Kimi Räikkönen finished third. This was the first race at the modified Nürburgring circuit, as the first chicane was replaced by the Mercedes Arena corners.

The victory was Barrichello's second of his career and the first of the 2002 season; the result moved him up to fourth in the Drivers' Championship but was tied with David Coulthard on points. Michael Schumacher extended his lead to be forty-six points ahead of Ralf Schumacher with Montoya a further three points behind. Schumacher tied the all-time held by Alain Prost with his 106th podium finish. Ferrari's one-two finish allowed them to draw further ahead of Williams in the Constructors' Championship and McLaren maintained third position. Renault extended their points advantage over Sauber in the battle for fourth place, with eight races remaining in the season.

Background
The Grand Prix was contested by eleven teams with two drivers each. The teams, also known as constructors, were Ferrari, McLaren, Williams, Sauber, Jordan, BAR, Renault, Jaguar, Arrows, Minardi and Toyota.

Going into the race, Ferrari driver Michael Schumacher led the Drivers' Championship with 70 points, ahead of Williams teammates Ralf Schumacher and Juan Pablo Montoya who were tied for second place on 27 points. David Coulthard was a close fourth on 26 points, and Rubens Barrichello was fifth on 16 points. In the Constructors' Championship, Ferrari were leading with 86 points, ahead of Williams in second on 54 points. McLaren were third with 33 points, while Renault (twelve) and Sauber (eight) battled for fourth place. Ferrari and Michael Schumacher had dominated the championship, with Ralf Schumacher winning the Malaysian Grand Prix and Coulthard won the Monaco Grand Prix. Barrichello and Montoya had finished in second, and Kimi Räikkönen finished in third.

Michael Schumacher had won the previous two European Grands Prix held at the Nürburgring and wanted to concentrate on the potential challenge from the Williams and McLaren teams at the race rather than worry about a possible disqualification from the Austrian Grand Prix where he was given victory after Barrichello was ordered by Ferrari to allow Schumacher past. After retiring from the Canadian Grand Prix with an engine failure which cost him a chance to challenge for victory, Montoya said he had recovered from his disappointment and he was hoping to build on his podium finish from the previous year's European Grand Prix. He also said that Williams had addressed his engine problems. Räikkönen was looking forward to racing at the Nürburgring where it was the home race of McLaren's engine supplier Mercedes-Benz and was hoping to secure a good finish for the German fans.

After the previous race held at the Nürburgring (the 2001 European Grand Prix) the layout of the circuit was changed, its first major change since it was reopened in 1984. The chicane which previously formed the first corner was replaced by a sharp right-hand hairpin and included a tight left and right-hand corner and the changes were designed to make overtaking opportunities more common. The asphalt was widened by 25 meters to facilitate any overtaking manoeuvres. The changes increased the length of the circuit by 645 yards (590 metres) and the number of laps of the Grand Prix were reduced from 67 to 60. Jaguar team principal and former World Champion Niki Lauda felt the new layout would secure a better view for spectators watching in the grandstands. The new section received mixed reviews from the drivers and critics. Ralf Schumacher said it was "a nice part of the circuit"  though he found it difficult to find the ideal braking point and felt overtaking would still be difficult. Jordan driver Takuma Sato noted although the surface was bumpy upon entry he felt being unsighted in the first corner would be "a good feeling". Retired driver and columnist for Bild Hans-Joachim Stuck described it as "sexiest the new corner on the Formula One circuit" and that it was made for aggressive drivers. Coulthard was more vocal in his criticism saying the bumpiness of the section was "ridiculous" and preferred the challenge of the former first corner chicane, while Montoya felt the section was "too slow".

Some teams made modifications to their cars in preparation for the event. Ferrari brought new electronic bi-directional telemetry and steering wheels and Michael Schumacher evaluated a new engine cover which was not used in the Sunday race. Renault introduced a new aerodynamic package and a traction control system and McLaren brought a new revision of their aerodynamic package. BAR débuted a revised Honda V10 engine specification for the race and Jordan made minor alterations to their front wings.

Practice

Four practice sessions were held before the Sunday race, two each on Friday and Saturday. The Friday morning and afternoon sessions each lasted an hour; the third and fourth sessions, on Saturday morning, lasted 45 minutes each. The Saturday morning practice and afternoon qualifying sessions began 45 minutes earlier from their usual start times of 09:00 CEST (UTC+2), 10:15 and 14:00 to accommodate the final two quarter-final matches of the 2002 FIFA World Cup held in South Korea and Japan on the same day. Conditions for the Friday practice sessions were warm and overcast. Barrichello set the fastest time of the first practice session with a lap time of 1 minute and 33.665 seconds, one-tenth of a second faster than his Ferrari teammate Michael Schumacher. Nick Heidfeld (with a time of 1:34.924) was third fastest, ahead of Allan McNish and Felipe Massa. Coulthard, Frentzen, Giancarlo Fisichella, Mika Salo and Montoya rounded out the top ten fastest drivers of the session. Enrique Bernoldi lost the rear-end of his Arrows at the Ford Kurve in the 36th minute of the session and his car's right side made light contact with a tyre wall; this required a yellow-flag to be shown as marshals were needed to remove Bernoldi's car from the track. In the second practice session, Coulthard was the fastest driver with a time of 1:31.886 despite going off into a gravel trap at Dunlop Kurve; Räikkönen finished with the third quickest time. The Ferrari drivers second and fourth; Michael Schumacher ahead of Barrichello. They were followed by the two Williamses of Montoya (who complained of understeer) and Ralf Schumacher. Jarno Trulli and Jenson Button were seventh and eighth for Renault with Salo and Panis completing the top ten.

It remained warm and overcast for the Saturday morning practice sessions. Michael Schumacher set the fastest time of the third session of 1:30.658 which was recorded at the end of the session though he lost control of the rear-end of his Ferrari after clipping a kerb at the Veedol-S chicane early in the session. His teammate Barrichello was second fastest. Ralf Schmacher was third fastest, ahead of his Williams teammate Montoya. Heidfeld secured the fifth fastest time ahead of Räikkönen. Massa, Button, Coulthard and Trulli followed in the top ten. In the final practice session, Michael Schumacher was unable to improve his time but remained fastest; Barrichello finished with the third quickest lap. Heidfeld was running quicker and was fourth, ahead of Ralf Schumacher and Salo. Coulthard, Montoya, Trulli and Button completed the top ten ahead of qualifying. de la Rosa had a hydraulic leak and fire in his car which prevented him from setting a lap time.

Qualifying

Saturday's afternoon qualifying session lasted for an hour. Each driver was limited to twelve laps, with the starting order decided by the drivers' fastest laps. During this session, the 107% rule was in effect, which necessitated each driver set a time within 107% of the quickest lap to qualify for the race. Montoya clinched his third consecutive pole position and the seventh of his career with a time of 1:29.906 which was set thirteen minutes before the session ended. He was happy to take the pole position despite having set a target to be on the second row. Montoya was joined on the front row of the grid by teammate Ralf Schumacher who was 0.009 seconds off Montoya's pace and did not change his car's set-up. Michael Schumacher qualified in third and his race car was stuck in gear on his first out lap and switched to the spare Ferrari car for the remainder of the session as his mechanics were unable to rectify the gearbox issue. He made two minor mistakes at the final two corners of the circuit on his final run after pushing hard which prevented him from improving his lap time. Barrichello progressively changed his car's balance over the one-hour qualifying period and secured fourth. Coulthard changed his set-up to run faster in the circuit's middle section which compromised performance in the first sector but took fifth. Räikkönen dropped one of his wheels on the turn thirteen kerbs which restricted him to sixth. The two Renault drivers filled the fourth row of the grid with Trulli ahead of Button. Trulli was happy with his starting position although Button had understeer from his second qualifying run and made a minor change to his rear anti roll-bar in an attempt to go quicker but was delayed by slower cars. Heidfeld felt vibrations after flat-spotting his front-right tyre on his first run which restricted him to ninth. Salo rounded out the top ten qualifiers and reported his car handled best on his first run but it deteriorated afterwards.

Massa improved the balance on his Sauber but had excessive oversteer through turns two and four and managed eleventh. Panis took twelfth. He was ahead of McNish in the slower of the two Toyotas and his car developed intermittent issues with his electronics. Sato in the faster Jordan followed in 14th place and was disappointed with his performance as he struggled with an excessive amount of oversteer throughout qualifying. He was followed in the time sheets by Frentzen who was suffering from understeer which caused him to lose time in the circuit's first sector. de la Rosa drove the spare Jaguar monocoque for two laps and did two further laps in his repaired race car; he said his race car felt better balance but was delayed on his final run which restricted him to 16th. Irvine said he picked up understeer in the one-hour session and had difficulty of accelerating out of corners; these issues meant he could only take 17th. He was in front of Fisichella in the slower Jordan. Villeneuve managed 19th and was unable to find a suitable car set-up and his car had become slower. The two Minardi drivers qualified in the 20th and 22nd positions with Mark Webber quicker than Alex Yoong; they were separated by Bernoldi who had balance problems.

Qualifying classification

Warm-up
The drivers took to the track at 09:30 local time for a 30-minute warm-up session, in overcast weather conditions. Barrichello maintained his form by setting the fastest lap in the closing moments of the session, with a lap of 1:32.671, three-tenths of a second faster than teammate Michael Schumacher who traded the fastest time with Barrichello during the session. Coulthard was third fastest and Räikkönen rounded out the top four; both drivers were more than one second off Barrichello's pace.

Race
The race started at 14:00 local time. When the race started, Montoya and Ralf Schumacher drew alongside each other heading into the first corner, with Ralf Schumacher passing Montoya for the lead by taking the outside line. Coulthard, who started fifth, made a quick getaway but slid wide allowing Barrichello and Michael Schumacher to reclaim their starting positions. Both Jordan drivers collided with Fisichella spinning into Sato at the first corner; the pair dropped to the rear-end of the field and both made pit stops for repairs at the end of the first lap. Michael Schumacher got ahead of Montoya for third on the same lap but Montoya momentarily reclaimed the position, while Barrichello overtook Ralf Schumacher for the lead on the straight heading into turn eight. Michael Schumacher eventually moved ahead of Montoya by the end of lap one. At the end of the first lap, Barrichello led Ralf Schumacher by one second, with Michael Schumacher a further two seconds behind in third. Montoya in fourth was followed by Coulthard, Räikkönen, Button, Trulli, Massa and Heidfeld.

Barrichello started to pull away from Ralf Schumacher who was being caught by Michael Schumacher. Elsewhere in the field, Bernoldi moved ahead of Irvine for 14th position and Villeneuve overtook Yoong and de la Rosa to move into 18th. Michael Schumacher moved into second place after he passed Ralf Schumacher at the RTL Kurve on the third lap and began to close the gap to Barrichello. Panis moved ahead of Salo for twelfth and Villeneuve overtook Webber for 17th. Villeneuve ran wide during the course of lap four but retained his 17th position. Trulli ran deep into turn one and fell down from eighth to twelfth place on the following lap, while Barrichello and Michael Schumacher continued to pull away from Ralf Schumacher. Trulli regained eleventh position after passing Panis on lap six while Salo in 13th spun and lost six positions. Webber made mistake and ran wide on lap seven and dropped behind de la Rosa and Salo to 19th position, while Yoong took a drive-through penalty because he jumped the start. By lap eight, Michael Schumacher was catching teammate Barrichello and was 1.4 seconds behind the Brazilian driver, and was right behind him by the tenth lap. Trulli had moved back up into ninth on the same lap after overtaking McNish and Heidfeld, while Bernoldi was passed by Frentzen for 13th place.

Fisichella's Jordan lost parts of its bodywork as he drove down the main straight on lap eleven having bounced heavily on the kerbs and grass lining the circuit earlier in the race. de la Rosa passed Irvine for 16th on the same lap. Bernoldi lost 14th position after he was overtaken by Villeneuve on the 13th lap, while Frentzen ran off the circuit and was passed by Villeneuve and Bernoldi; the latter also drove off the circuit on the following lap. Räikkonen ran wide at the Yokohama-S and struggled to drive his car from the outside of the track allowing Button to take advantage to move into sixth on lap 17.

The Ferrari and Williams teams were employing different strategies – the Ferrari team were planning a two-stop strategy whereas the Williams team were only planning for one stop. Michael Schumacher made a pit stop on lap 24 and exited in front of Ralf Schumacher.

Race classification

Championship standings after the race 

Drivers' Championship standings

Constructors' Championship standings

Note: Only the top five positions are included for both sets of standings.

References

European Grand Prix
European Grand Prix
European Grand Prix
June 2002 sports events in Europe